Lee Eui-kyung (Korean: 이의경; Hanja: 李儀卿; born 14 December 1962) is a South Korean professor of pharmacy at Sungkyunkwan University who has previously served as President Moon Jae-in's Minister of Food and Drug Safety from 2019 to 2020.

Education 
Lee holds three degrees in pharmacy: Bachelor and Master's from Seoul National University and Ph.D. from University of Iowa.

Career 
Lee is widely regarded as the first generation social pharmacology expert of South Korea. She developed career in pharmacy at universities and government-funded research institutions. From 1999 she has served as a member of Central Advisory Committee on Pharmaceutical Affairs. After working as a research director at Korea Institute for Health and Social Affairs for over fifteen years, Lee taught at Graduate School of Clinical Pharmacy at Sookmyung Women's University from 2006 to 2012 during which she served as a vice-chair of Korean Association of Health Technology Assessment, president and Korean Academy of Social and Managed Care Pharmacy. From 2010 she is leading Korea Regional Chapter of International Society For Pharmacoeconomics Outcomes Research. She continued teaching at School of Pharmacy at Sungkyunkwan University as an associate professor from 2012 and professor from 2015. In 2013 she was elected as the third president of Korean Association of Health Technology Assessment.

In an interview, Lee revealed that she had never met President Moon in person and has no knowledge of who recommended her appointment.

References 

Living people
Seoul National University alumni
University of Iowa alumni
Academic staff of Sungkyunkwan University
1962 births
Government ministers of South Korea
Women government ministers of South Korea
South Korean women academics
Clinical pharmacologists